Aleksandar Andrejević (born February 13, 1991) is a Serbian professional basketball player for CB Peñas Huesca of the LEB Oro.

Andrejević spent the 2020–21 season with Kumanovo of the Macedonian First League. He averaged 12.4 points, 7.7 rebounds, and 1.1 assists per game. On September 28, 2021, Andrejević signed with CB Peñas Huesca.

References

External links 
 Profile at eurobasket.com
 Profile at realgm.com

1991 births
Living people
Basketball League of Serbia players
KK FMP (1991–2011) players
KK Mladost Zemun players
KK Leotar players
KK Spartak Subotica players
KK Zdravlje players
BKK Radnički players
Serbian men's basketball players
Serbian expatriate basketball people in Bosnia and Herzegovina
Serbian expatriate basketball people in Bulgaria
Serbian expatriate basketball people in Montenegro
Serbian expatriate basketball people in North Macedonia
Serbian expatriate basketball people in Switzerland
Vevey Riviera Basket players
Centers (basketball)